Khoo Chin-bee (born 4 May 1977) is a Malaysian former tennis player.

She won one singles title and nine doubles titles on the ITF Circuit in her career. On 15 September 2003, she reached her best singles ranking of world No. 329. On 17 August 1998, she peaked at No. 209 in the doubles rankings.

Playing for Malaysia at the Fed Cup, Khoo has a win–loss record of 25–17. She retired from the pro circuit in 2009.

ITF Circuit finals

Singles: 6 (1 title, 5 runner-ups)

Doubles: 22 (9 titles, 13 runner-ups)

References

External links
 
 
 

1977 births
Living people
People from Perak
Malaysian people of Chinese descent
Malaysian female tennis players
Southeast Asian Games silver medalists for Malaysia
Southeast Asian Games bronze medalists for Malaysia
Southeast Asian Games medalists in tennis
Competitors at the 1999 Southeast Asian Games
Competitors at the 2001 Southeast Asian Games
Competitors at the 2003 Southeast Asian Games
20th-century Malaysian women
21st-century Malaysian women